Zor Abu Zayd is a Syrian village located in the Suran Subdistrict in Hama District. According to the Syria Central Bureau of Statistics (CBS), Zor Abu Zayd had a population of 838 in the 2004 census.

References 

Populated places in Hama District